UPAY (उपाय) or Under Privileged Advancement by Youth is a non-governmental organization which works towards the provision of quality education to the underprivileged children in India. It was founded by Varun Shrivastava, an IIT Kharagpur-graduate and NTPC Ltd Engineer, with the help of his colleagues on 12 May 2010 to make quality education available at the remote villages of India. It was registered as an NGO on 19 September 2011.

History
UPAY (Underprivileged Advancement by Youth), was founded on 20 May 2010 by a group of young engineers from IITs and NITs  working at NTPC Ltd in a small village called Kumbhari in the outskirts of Nagpur. It has been registered as an NGO under the Society Registration Act, 1860 and Mumbai Public Trust Act, 1950 (Reg No. Maharashtra/268/2011/Bhandara). Its main aim is to provide opportunities to underprivileged children. Since its inception, a large number of educated youth has joined this movement and has been spreading it across the country. Its members include teachers, doctors, engineers, lawyers, students, housewives, retired persons and other working professionals.

Projects

Reach & Teach

UPAY was established to provide a SOLUTION to the everlasting problem of rural education. It is working on developing a sustainable process of imparting knowledge to these underprivileged children. We teach as well as imbibe our children with the spirit of UPAY. These children are further carrying this responsibility of upliftment of society. So these children are not just the students of UPAY but they are also the harbingers and volunteers of UPAY who are spreading its cause across the country. Right now, it has 17 centers having 1300 children.

Footpath Shala

In cities like Nagpur, Pune, Gurgaon and Mumbai people living on the footpath are doing some unskilled labor or literally begging for their bread & butter are some of them. There are people in the society who don’t have any planning for their future, who are struggling against poverty, malnutrition, unhealthiness, family planning. UPAY  has taken initiative to replace begging bowls with books for street children in 9 centers with 350 street children enrolled at footpathshala. 20% street children are enrolled in schools. It is an open pathshala, similar to Rabindranath Tagore`s concept of open schools. Classes are being taken by UPAY volunteers at Footpath only.

Sabkasaamaan.com
Apart from educating the children, UPAY is also working on how to make these underprivileged areas economically independent. UPAY is targeting to tap the local skills and plans to develop small scale industries. Besides seasonal agricultural income, villagers should have perineal source of income and development. For this, a small development is introduction of an online portal,”sabkasaamaan.com”. On this the local products developed by the villagers are available for sale. So that apart from the weekly village markets and limited customer base now their produce are getting exposure to a wide network.

Granth on Rath
We believe that if children can't reach to school, school must reach to them. with that concept UPAY has started an initiative" Footpathshala" for street children of Nagpur city by starting an open school at footpath . our volunteers go to footpaths of city where street children beg and live. we have started  teaching them there only. This initiative has been very successful and at present we are operating at 5 locations with more than 100 street children coming to our open school. but developing a school infra structure at footpath was very much challenging so we have started a mobile school with mobile library, which is having all the necessary thing  for running the Footpathshala . as there is no power supply at footpaths, we keep a battery run lights, projectors, TV for showing videos etc.

GRANTH ON RATH is a mobile library for recycling the old books to the Under-privileged students from affluent students and bridge the rural urban divide.

Books are provided to the under privileged students at a very nominal rent. We work as a medium providing the flow of books from rich students to needy & poor student .

Every student has some set of books that are no more useful for them, those books can be used by some other student depending on the requirement. We will collect all those useless books from students and in return we will give books of their use on nominal rent of 20% of actual cost. At the same time we can Improve Incomes of villagers by providing employment opportunities to rural women for recycling and maintenance of books because to handle such quantum of books we need few workers who can collect, segregate and distribute the books.

A small maintenance of the books will increase their life and same book can be useful for 2-3 students. Along with the books we will also collect the used notebooks; in the end of every note book we can find some unused pages which can be used for making a new notebook which could be sold on nominal price to generate some revenue. Waste and unused papers/books can be used for making paper.

Awards and recognition 

1. Vidarbha CSR Award of Best NGO in the Field of Education.

2. LOKMATA SAMAJIK SANSTHA PURASKAR  by LOKMATA SUMATITAI SMRUTI PRATISHTHAN, November 2017

3. Certificate of Merit by World CSR day & world Sustainability Award.

4. Jiyo dil Se award season IV by 94.3 my FM.

5.Quest For excellence Award 2013 by Power HR forum.

6. Maitri Gaurav Award 2016.

7.Central India Achiever Award by GPS Global PANORAMA Showcase.

8. Manviyata Puruskar by NTPC Mouda

9. Certificate of Merit for the Top 100 NGOs In India by World CSR Day and Dr. RL Bhatia Foundation, February 2018.

10. Swacchta ambassador: awarded for raising awareness through rallies, flash mobs, skits about cleanliness in villages of Mauda by Mauda Nagar panchayat, October 2017.

11. World CSR day: Pride of India, NGO Leadership award, by World CSR Day and Dr. RL Bhatia Foundation, August 2018.

12. Award for Rural development and Upliftment by Mouda Nagar Panchayat, August 2018.

13. "Nagpur Icon" by Rotary Club of Nagpur Vision, November 2018.

14. Global Nagpur Award by Nagpur First, 5th Edition of Annual Global Awards.

15. Finalists of Times of India's Nagpur Heroes Award, January 2019.

16. Certificate of Merit for the Top 100 NGOs In India by World CSR Day and Dr. RL Bhatia Foundation, February 2019.

17. NGO Leadership Award, 2019 by World CSR Day, July 2019.

References

 http://www.upay.org.in/index.php/
 http://www.apnasaamaan.com/
 https://www.facebook.com/pages/UPAYUnder-Privilegeds-Advancement-By-Youth/245407178844117?fref=ts
 UPAY in media: http://www.upay.org.in/z/index.php?option=com_content&view=article&id=28&Itemid=865

 

Organisations based in Nagpur
Educational organisations based in India
Organizations established in 2010
2010 establishments in Maharashtra